Tameside College is a further education college located in Ashton-under-Lyne, Greater Manchester, England.

The college offers a range of courses for students from Tameside and the surrounding area. These courses include NVQs,  BTECs, Apprenticeships, Access courses the college also runs adult learning in the evenings.  As well as its operations from its main site in Ashton-under-Lyne, the college also operates three Local Learning Centres in Ashton-under-Lyne, Droylsden and Hyde.

Tameside College opened a brand new campus in Ashton Town Centre in 2018 as part of the rengeration work within the town. The new campus includes improved facilities and a larger space to accommodate future students.

Tameside College also owns and operates Clarendon Sixth Form College also in Ashton-under-Lyne, offering A-Levels to local school-leavers. The College Principal is Jackie Moores.

Notable former pupils
 Mick Hucknall, singer-songwriter, former frontman of Simply Red
 David Potts - CEO, Morrisons

References

External links
 Tameside College homepage

Further education colleges in Greater Manchester
Education in Tameside